The Robert Schumann Prize for Poetry and Music Mainz is a classical music prize named after Robert Schumann, awarded biennially since 2012. The prize money is €15,000 (2012–2016: €25,000), donated by the Strecker Foundation, Mainz. The prize is awarded by the Akademie der Wissenschaften und der Literatur in Mainz, for "personalities with an outstanding lifetime achievement in the field of poetry and music".

Recipients
 2012 Pierre Boulez
 2014 Wolfgang Rihm
 2016 Aribert Reimann
 2018 Jörg Widmann
 2020 Olga Neuwirth
 2022 Heinz Holliger

References

External links
 

German music awards
Classical music awards
Robert Schumann
Awards established in 2012